Halim is a 2006 Egyptian film about the Egyptian singer Abdel Halim Hafez. Production started in 2005 with Ahmed Zaki in the title role, but the actor died prior to the film's completion, so his son (Haitham Ahmed Zaki) filled in several scenes. The film was released in July 2006 with Mona Zaki, Sulaf Fawakherji, directed by Sherif Arafa, written by Mahfouz Abd El-Rahman, music by Ammar El Sherei and produced by Good News 4 Film & Music Company. It participated out of the competition at the 2006 Cannes Film Festival.

Cast
 Ahmed Zaki as Abdel Halim Hafez
  Haitham Ahmed Zaki as Abdel Halim Hafez - Young 
 Mona Zaki as Nawal 
 Jamal Suliman as Ramzi
 Sulaf Fawakherji as Jeehan
 Ezzat Abou Aouf as Mohammed Abdel Wahab

External links

2000s Arabic-language films
Egyptian biographical films
2006 films
2000s biographical films